Valerolactone may refer to:

 delta-Valerolactone
 gamma-Valerolactone